Megalichthys is a genus of prehistoric lobe-finned fish which lived during the Devonian and Carboniferous periods. It is the type genus of the family Megalichthyidae.  The type species is M. hibberti. The species M. mullisoni, named for fossil preparator C Frederick Mullison, is known from the Catskill Formation of Pennsylvania.

References 

Prehistoric lobe-finned fish genera
Carboniferous bony fish
Carboniferous fish of Europe
Megalichthyiforms